Paul Schulz (5 February 1898 Stettin – 31 August 1963 Laichingen) was a German military officer and Nazi Party official perhaps best known as a leader of the Black Reichswehr in the 1920s.

Early years 

Schulz entered non-commissioned officers' school in Potsdam in 1912. Wounded several times in World War I, he was promoted to Leutnant in the spring of 1918 because of bravery and outstanding performance. After the end of the war Schulz joined the Freikorps. He took part in the fighting in the Baltic States in a battalion commanded by Bruno Ernst Buchrucker. He became Buchrucker's adjutant in the Reichswehr and was promoted to Oberleutnant. Because of their support for the Kapp Putsch in March 1920, Schulz and Buchrucker both were discharged from the army.

Black Reichswehr

Schulz was reinstated by the Ministry of the Reichswehr under private contract as part of the so-called Black Reichswehr. This was a paramilitary organization in the Weimar Republic that was used to provide additional manpower reserves for the Reichswehr, in violation of the Versailles Treaty. Schulz was commissioned to set up a work detachment in Küstrin. At the end of 1922, Schulz moved to the Wehrkreis (Military District) III in Berlin, where he set up other work groups for the Black Reichswehr. During the Küstrin Putsch on 1 October 1923, Schulz was arrested but ultimately not charged.

Schulz was next involved with the management of the "Feme Organization" in Prussia. In this capacity he planned and organized the murder of left-wing politicians and other alleged "enemies of the Reich" by members of the Black Reichswehr. Because of his involvement in these Feme murders, Schulz was given the nickname "Feme-Schulz". In March 1925 Schulz was arrested for inciting several murders. Brought to trial, he was sentenced to death on 26 March 1927. Just before his scheduled execution, Schulz's death sentence was commuted to life imprisonment by President Paul von Hindenburg in February 1928. To large parts of the German right wing he was considered a martyr. While in jail, Schulz was in contact with numerous right wing politicians, including Gregor Strasser of the Nazi Party. In May 1928, the 12 newly elected Nazi members of the Reichstag called for his release. A political amnesty was granted in October 1930 and Schulz obtained his freedom. He joined the Nazi Party on 24 October 1930 and was assigned to Strasser’s Organisationsabteilung (Organization Department) at Party headquarters in Munich.

Nazi Party career 
Though not a member of the Sturmabteilung (SA), Schulz was temporarily appointed Acting SA Leader-East in April 1931. He was given the task of reorganizing the Berlin SA in the wake of the Stennes Revolt. Schulz brought the mutinous Berlin SA again under control of the party leadership and left the post at the end of May. 

Returning to Strasser’s organization, he was made head of the department (Arbeitsdienstpflichtamt) charged with setting up the Party’s prototype labor service system in October 1931. Schulz very soon established a warm personal friendship and solid working relationship with Strasser. With his numerous contacts in the army, civil service and industry, he often served as Strasser’s intermediary to influential people outside the Party, including General Kurt von Schleicher and Chancellor Heinrich Brüning. In April 1932, Schulz was elected as a member of the Prussian Landtag. 

In the summer of 1932 Strasser initiated a series of organizational reforms to consolidate and centralize the Party structure by imposing an additional layer of supervision on the Gauleiters. Strasser sought to improve organizational control of the Party ahead of the upcoming election to the German Reichstag. On 15 June 1932 Schulz was appointed to the new position of Reichsinspekteur I, with oversight responsibility for five new Landesinspekteurs, each overseeing between one and five Gaue. Robert Ley was appointed Reichsinspekteur II, responsible for another five Landesinspekteurs. Thus, Schulz, in a relatively brief time, reached the highest levels in the Party hierarchy. However, his tenure proved to be short-lived.
 
On 8 December 1932, Strasser resigned as Reichsorganisationsleiter in a major policy dispute with Hitler over the future direction of the Party. In seeking to eradicate Strasser’s legacy, Hitler decreed a thorough revocation of the recent administrative reforms. The positions of Landesinspekteur and Reichsinspekteur were abolished. Hitler temporarily assumed the duties of Reichsorganisationsleiter, with Ley as Chief of Staff. Schulz, closely associated with Strasser, followed him into retirement.

Night of the Long Knives and later life 

On 30 June 1934 during the Night of the Long Knives, Strasser was killed along with dozens of Hitler’s opponents. Schulz was arrested and taken to Gestapo headquarters. Then he was driven into the Grunewald Forest outside Potsdam near the village of Seddiner See where he was shot in the back. Schulz, seriously injured, fell to the ground and feigned death. When the assassins turned away to fetch a tarpaulin to remove of the body, Schulz fled into the forest and managed to escape. For the next few days he stayed with a friend who, acting as an intermediary, obtained a guarantee of protection from Hitler in exchange for Schulz leaving Germany. Schulz left for Switzerland on 20 July 1934 and lived there as a businessman. He later moved to Athens in 1935, and in 1940 to Budapest. 
After the war, Schulz returned to West Germany. He was active as an businessman and ultimately managed a construction machinery plant in Neustadt an der Weinstrasse. In 1963 he died in Laichingen.

References

Sources

External links
 Oberleutnant Paul Schulz 1898–1963, Organisator der „Schwarzen Reichswehr“, accessed 24 August 2020.
Paul Schulz at the Bundesarchiv

1898 births
1963 deaths
German Army personnel of World War I
Nazi Party officials
Military personnel from Szczecin
Reichswehr personnel
20th-century Freikorps personnel
20th-century German businesspeople